43rd London Film Critics' Circle Awards
5 February 2023

Film of the Year:
Tár

British/Irish Film of the Year:
The Banshees of Inisherin

The 43rd London Film Critics' Circle Awards honoured the best in film of 2022, as chosen by the London Film Critics' Circle. All films released in a UK cinema or to premiere via streaming service between February 2022 and February 2023 were all eligible to be nominated. The ceremony was held on 5 February 2023 at The May Fair Hotel in London. The nominations were announced on 21 December 2022 by actors Ellie Bamber and Fionn O'Shea, while British comedian and actor Anna Leong Brophy hosted the ceremony. The Banshees of Inisherin received the most nominations with nine, followed by Aftersun with eight.

Acclaimed actress, producer, and UNDP Goodwill Ambassador Michelle Yeoh received the Dilys Powell Award for Excellence in Film.

Winners and nominees

Winners are listed first and highlighted with boldface.

References

External links
 Official site

2
2023 in London
2022 film awards
2022 in British cinema
2022 awards in the United Kingdom
February 2023 events in the United Kingdom